Louis Clincke (born 28 December 1986) is a Belgian Para-cyclist.  Louis was severely injured in a frontal head-on collision in 2013, spent a year in hospital and started his para-cycling career in 2017.

References

Living people
Belgian male cyclists
People from Eeklo
Cyclists from East Flanders
20th-century Belgian people
21st-century Belgian people
1986 births